The 2019 ABC Supply 500 was the 14th round of the 2019 IndyCar Series season. The race was held on August 18 at Pocono Raceway in Long Pond, Pennsylvania. Approaching rain and lightning cause the race to be shortened to only 128 of the scheduled 200 laps allowing Will Power to capture victory. As of 2022, this was the last time that IndyCar has visited Pocono.

Background

Entrants

Pre-Race Activities

Practice 
Practice was scheduled for 9:30 AM ET on August 17, 2019. Practice was cancelled due to weather in the area that would have prevented the medical helicopter from being to take off.

Qualifying 
No qualifying session took place for the race, as officials were forced to cancel the session due to rain. As a result, qualifying results and the starting lineup for the race were determined based on the driver standings after the previous race, the Honda Indy 200. As the points leader, Josef Newgarden was awarded pole position.

Qualifying classification

Final Practice 
The only practice session took place at 1:50 PM ET on August 17, 2019.

Race  

The race started at 2:30 PM ET on August 18, 2019.

Race classification

Championship standings after the race

Drivers' Championship standings

 Note: Only the top five positions are included.

References

ABC Supply 500
ABC Supply 500
ABC Supply 500